EverWing is a game created by Game Closure (formerly Blackstorm Labs) and released on the Instant Games platform in Facebook Messenger in November 2016.

Gameplay 
EverWing is a vertical scrolling shooter game in which Guardians and their dragon Sidekicks fight against hordes of Monsters and Bosses in order to reclaim their kingdom.

Game modes

Single Player 
Single Player is the core EverWing game mode in which players control Guardians in their endless fight to defeat monsters and bosses.

Boss Raids 
Boss Raids is a cooperative multiplayer mode which allows players to team up with their friends to defeat super monsters. Boss Raids launched as part of an in-game event, The Reckoning, on March 1, 2017.

Quests 
Quests allow users to send their Guardian Sophia on missions, and come back later to claim treasure collected by the Guardian.

Guardians

Sidekicks 
Sidekicks are dragons that can be bought as eggs, through either coins or gems, in the dragon roost, or obtained by challenging friends to play Everwing.

Dragons are one of five rarities: Common, Rare, Epic, Legendary and Mythic. Common dragons have no special powers, but have high attack damage. Rare dragons have special powers, and medium attack damage. Legendary dragons usually have better special powers, and medium to high attack damage.

Dragons have a different number of stars depending on how evolved they are. A one-star dragon can only level up to level 10. It must be evolved to level up further and become a 2-star dragon. A 2-star dragon can only level up to level 20 before it must evolve up to 3 stars. A level 30, 3-star dragon is the highest level a dragon can reach. Two dragons at level 30 can be combined to limit break, exceeding the maximum level of 30. 

In order to evolve a dragon, the player needs two of the same dragons at their maximum level. If they have the same zodiac sign, the dragon will receive bonus damage of 25% and 30% for each tier.

Dragons can be sold (permanently) for Dragonfruit. Dragons that are at level 10, 20 or 30 sell for Dragonfruit, whereas at any other level, it is also for Dragonfruit.

Dragon Eggs

Gamebot 
EverWing features a gamebot which notifies users about the status of leaderboard competitions, as well as their various Boss Raids and Quests. Players can also interact with the gamebot to manage their Quests directly from the chat thread, claiming treasures, and redeploying their Guardians again on another Quest.

Awards 
EverWing was named the Facebook Game of the Year in 2016.

References 

2016 video games
Action video games
Cooperative video games
Video games about dragons
Facebook games
Fantasy video games
Vertically scrolling shooters
Video games featuring female protagonists
Multiplayer and single-player video games